Theodor Andrei (born 9 October 2004) is a Romanian singer. He will represent Romania at the 2023 Eurovision Song Contest with the song "D.G.T. (Off and On)".

Biography 
Theodor Andrei made himself known by participating in the 2017 talent show Vocea Romaniei Junior, the Romanian version of The Voice Kids, where he reached the semifinal. In 2020, he took part in the local version of The X Factor, where he stopped at bootcamps. His debut album, Fragil, was released in 2022.

In December 2022, Theodor Andrei was confirmed among the 12 participants in Selecția Națională 2023, a festival used to select the Romanian representative in the annual Eurovision Song Contest. D.G.T. (Off and On), his song for the competition, had already been released as a track on his album in collaboration with Luca Udățeanu; for the occasion, a 3-minute solo version was released, the maximum duration for a Eurovision piece. On 11 February 2023, the singer performed at Selecția Națională, where televoting chose him as the winner among the 12 proposals and national representative at the Eurovision Song Contest 2023 in Liverpool.

Awards 
In 2022, he received the Myosotis Award at Radar de Media Awards for the best creation of a singer-songwriter, for the song Artist.

Discography

Albums

Singles 

 2017 – Young and Sweet
 2018 – Și dacă azi zâmbesc
 2019 – Stelele de pe cer
 2019 – Nu te mira ca nu te place
 2020 – Nu le place
 2020 – Nu mai vreau sentimente (con Oana Velea)
 2020 – Beatu' asta fire
 2020 – Crăciunul ăsta
 2021 – Genul meu
 2021 – Selectiv
 2021 – Tatuaj
 2022 – Ţigări mentolate (con Valentina)
 2022 – Prigoria Teen Fest (con Shtrood)
 2022 – D.G.T. (Off and On)

References 

Romanian singers
2004 births
Eurovision Song Contest entrants of 2023
Living people
Eurovision Song Contest entrants for Romania